Trevor Charles Watts (born 26 February 1939) is an English jazz and free-improvising alto and soprano saxophonist.

Biography
Watts was born in York, England. He is largely self-taught, having taken up the cornet at age 12 then switched to saxophone at 18. While stationed in Germany with the RAF (1958–63), he encountered the drummer John Stevens and trombonist Paul Rutherford. After being demobbed he returned to London. In 1965, he and Stevens formed the Spontaneous Music Ensemble, which became one of the crucibles of British free improvisation. Watts left the band to form his own group Amalgam in 1967, then returned to SME for another stretch that lasted until the mid-1970s. Another key association was with the bassist Barry Guy and his London Jazz Composers' Orchestra, an association that lasted from the band's inception in the 1970s up to its  disbandment in the mid-1990s.

Though he was initially strongly identified with the avant-garde, Watts is a versatile musician who has worked in everything from straight jazz contexts to rock and blues. His own projects have come increasingly to focus on blending jazz and African music, notably the Moiré Music ensemble which he has led since 1982 in configurations ranging from large ensembles featuring multiple drummers to more intimate trios. He has only occasionally recorded in freer modes in recent years, notably the CD 6 Dialogues, a duet album with Veryan Weston (the pianist in earlier editions of Moiré Music). A solo album, World Sonic, appeared on Hi4Head Records in 2005.

Watts has toured the world over numerous times, run workshops, received grants and commissions, and he has collaborated with jazz musicians including Archie Shepp, Steve Lacy, Don Cherry, Jayne Cortez and Stephen Grew.  As of 2011, he continues to travel and toured North American with Veryan Weston.

Selected discography
1969: Amalgam: Prayer for Peace: Transatlantic Records
1971: Spontaneous Music Ensemble: So, What Do You Think?: Tangent
1971: Spontaneous Music Ensemble: 1.2. Albert Ayler: Affinity
1974: Amalgam: Innovation: Tangent
1976: Amalgam: Another Time: Vinyl
1977: With John Stevens: No Fear: Spotlite
1977: Amalgam: Deep: Vinyl
1977: Amalgam: "Samanna" Vinyl
1978: Cynosure: Ogun
1979: Amalgam: Over the Rainbow; ARC
1981: With Katrina Krimsky: Stella Malu: ECM
1985: Moiré Music: Trevor Watts' Moiré Music; ARC
1987: Moiré Music Sextet: Saalfelden Encore; Cadillac
1988: Moiré Music: With One Voice: FMR
1990: Moiré Music Drum Orchestra: Live In Latin America Vol.1: ARC
1991: Trevor Watts Moiré Music Group: Live in Latin America, Vol. 1 ARC
1994: Trevor Watts Moiré Music Group: A Wider Embrace: ECM
1995: Trevor Watts Moiré Music Group: Moiré Music Trio: Intakt Records
2000: Trevor Watts Moiré Music Group: Live at the Athens Concert Hall: ARC
2001: Trevor Watts and The Celebration Band : ARC
2002: Trevor Watts & Veryan Weston: 6 Dialogues: Emanem
2004: Amalgam: Semanna: FMR
2005: Trevor Watts: Rest of the Spotlight Sessions: Hi4Head (UK)
2005: Trevor Watts: World Sonic: Hi5Head (UK)
2006: Trevor Watts & Jamie Harris: Live in Sao Paulo, Brasil: Hi4Head
2007: Trevor Watts & Jamie Harris: Ancestry: Entropy Stereo
2008: The Original Trevor Watts Drum Orchestra: Drum Energy!: High Note
2008: Trevor Watts & Peter Knight: Reunion Live in London: Hi4Head (UK)
With the Spontaneous Music Ensemble
Quintessence (Emanem, 1974 [1986])
With Barry Guy/The London Jazz Composers' Orchestra
Ode (Incus, 1972)
Zurich Concerts (Intakt, 1988) with Anthony Braxton
Harmos (Intakt, 1989)
Double Trouble (Intakt, 1990)
Theoria (Intakt, 1991) with Irène Schweizer
Double Trouble Two (Intakt, 1998) with Irène Schweizer, Marilyn Crispell, and Pierre Favre
 Radio Rondo/Schaffhausen Concert (Intakt, 2009) with Irène Schweizer
With Paul Rutherford and Iskra 1912
 Sequences 72 & 73 (Emanem, 1997)

References

External links
Watts' homepage
EFI page for Trevor Watts
Trevor Watts on allmusic.com

1939 births
Living people
English jazz soprano saxophonists
English jazz alto saxophonists
British male saxophonists
Musicians from York
21st-century saxophonists
21st-century British male musicians
British male jazz musicians
Spontaneous Music Ensemble members
New Jazz Orchestra members
FMR Records artists
ECM Records artists
Intakt Records artists